The 1994 North Indian Ocean cyclone season was a below-average year in which eight tropical cyclones affected seven countries bordering the North Indian Ocean. The India Meteorological Department tracks all tropical cyclones in the basin, north of the equator. The first system developed on March 21 in the Bay of Bengal, the first March storm in the basin since 1938. Making landfall near the border of Bangladesh and Myanmar, the cyclone killed 350 people and left US$125 million in damage.

A storm in June originated over western India and crossed the northern Arabian Sea, later striking Oman. In August, a deep depression moved across much of India into Pakistan. Another deep depression in October killed 38 people in southeastern India. In late October, a storm crossed over Chennai in southern India, leaving US$115 million in damage and 304 deaths. There was a short-lived depression in November that struck southeastern India. The last storm of the season moved across the Arabian Sea and struck northeastern Somalia, killing 30 people.



Season summary 

During 1994, the India Meteorological Department (IMD) tracked 8 depressions, less than the average of 15. This included six systems in the Bay of Bengal and two systems over the Arabian Sea. The first system formed on March 21, becoming the first March depression in the Bay of Bengal since 1938. Of the eight depressions, six intensified into a deep depression, which has maximum sustained winds of 50–61 km/h (32–38 mph). Four deep depressions strengthened further into a cyclonic storm, which has sustained winds of at least . Two storms during the season became a very severe cyclonic storm, which is the equivalent of hurricane status, with winds of at least . During the season, the American-based Joint Typhoon Warning Center (JTWC) issued warnings for five of the tropical cyclones, which is the same as the long term average.

Systems

Extremely Severe Cyclonic Storm BOB 02 

A depression formed in the Bay of Bengal on April 29. It quickly organized over the next few days, as the storm moved around a ridge to its northeast. On May 1, the IMD upgraded the storm to a very severe cyclonic storm, by which time a well-defined eye was centered in the deepest convection, or thunderstorms. At around 17:00 UTC on May 2, the cyclone made landfall in southeastern Bangladesh about 30 km (18 mi) north of Teknaf Upazila. The storm rapidly weakened over land while continuing northeastward into Myanmar. Both the IMD and the JTWC discontinued advisories on May 3.

The storm closely followed the path, intensity, and time of year of a deadly cyclone in 1991 that killed 138,000 people. Ahead of the 1994 storm, about 450,000 people evacuated. In Bangladesh and neighboring Myanmar, the cyclone killed 285 people and caused about $125 million in damage. Damage was heaviest where the storm moved ashore, where almost every house was damage or destroyed, and 95% of trees were knocked down, blocking roads. The cyclone ultimately damaged or destroyed 69,973 homes in Bangladesh, leaving about 500,000 people homeless, including nearly 100,000 Rohingya refugees. The storm struck near low tide, which limited the storm surge flooding that proved deadly three years prior.

Severe Cyclonic Storm ARB 01 

After the annual monsoon moved across India, a thermal low developed in early June over Maharashtra in west-central India. Steered by the flow of the monsoon, the low moved offshore and tracked generally west-northwestward, bringing heavy rainfall and gusty winds to the coast. Ratnagiri, Maharashtra reported sustained winds of 74 km/h (46 mph). The IMD classified the low as a depression late on June 5, and upgraded it further to a cyclonic storm the next day. The storm weakened as it continued across the northern Arabian Sea. By June 9, the storm had weakened to a depression, and that day it passed near Masirah Island before moving over eastern Oman. The circulation dissipated soon after, but the remnants of the storm continued westward into Yemen. Along the Arabian Peninsula, the cyclone produced dust storms but little rainfall.

Severe Cyclonic Storm BOB 03 

A low-pressure area formed over the western Bay of Bengal on October 28. On the next day, the IMD classified it as a depression, and soon upgraded it to a deep depression. Also on October 30, the JTWC initiated advisories on the system as Tropical Cyclone 04B north of Sri Lanka. The storm consisted of a consolidating area of thunderstorms, with spiral rainbands. Steered by a ridge to the north, the system moved west-northwestward toward the southeast coast of India. Late on October 31, the storm fell below depression status after weakening over land.

Ahead of the storm, local officials coordinated the storm preparations, and about 93,000 people evacuated from low-lying areas. In Chennai where the storm moved ashore, the eye crossed over the city, causing a period of calm; before the calm, wind gusts reached , and sustained winds reached . In Chennai, the storm wrecked about 33,000 huts and 12 bridges. Across southeastern India, the storm dropped heavy rainfall, with a peak 24 hour total of  recorded at Gudluru, Andhra Pradesh. About 52,000 houses in Andhra Pradesh were damaged. The combination of winds and rains damaged crops and roads while knocking down hundreds of trees. Train service and communications were disrupted. In Andhra Pradesh and Tamil Nadu, the storm killed 304 people, and left about ₹3.1 billion (US$115 million) in damage. After the storm, state and local governments provided food and medicine.

Very Severe Cyclonic Storm ARB 02 

The JTWC began monitoring an area of thunderstorms on November 13 in the south-central Arabian Sea. A day later, the system organized into a low-pressure area, before developing into a depression on November 15, as classified by the IMD. On the same day, the JTWC classified the system as Tropical Cyclone 05A. The system moved slowly at first before beginning a general westward motion, steered by a ridge to the north. Convection organized around the center, signaling intensification. On November 16, the IMD upgraded the depression to a deep depression, and later cyclonic storm. The storm fluctuated in intensity until November 18, when a more pronounced strengthening trend began. The storm weakened significantly as it approached the Horn of Africa. On November 20, the storm made landfall in eastern Somalia near Eyl. The storm rapidly dissipated over land.

The storm's track into the Horn of Africa was unusual, bringing heavy rainfall to the region that swept away boats and homes. The storm killed 30 people in Somalia.

Other storms 

On March 20, a weak circulation was located northwest of Sumatra, associated with a persistent area thunderstorms. Fueled by inflow from the southern hemisphere, the system organized as it moved northwestward through the Andaman Islands. On March 21, the IMD classified the system as a depression, the first to occur in the Bay of Bengal in March since 1938, and one of only four on record during the month. On the next day, the JTWC initiated advisories, classifying the depression as Tropical Cyclone 01B. Strong wind shear prevented further development. Following an abrupt turn to the southwest, the depression weakened. The IMD downgraded the depression to a low on March 24, and the following day, the JTWC discontinued advisories.

An area of curved thunderstorms developed into a depression in the northwest Bay of Bengal at 03:00 UTC on August 17. It moved inland on August 18 near Chandabali, Odisha, and weakened as it continued northwestward through India. On August 21, the depression was last noted over southern Pakistan.

A low pressure in the western Bay of Bengal organized into a depression on October 4. The system developed spiral rainbands and an eye feature. Late on October 5, the deep depression moved ashore southeastern India near Machilipatnam, Andhra Pradesh. Nearby Gannavaram reported gusts of 74 km/h (46 mph). The system weakened while progressing inland, bringing heavy rainfall along its path. Storm-related flooding in southern Andhra Pradesh damaged crops and houses. The system weakened below depression status on October 7, and dissipated over northeastern India three days later. Across its path, the deep depression killed 38 people due to floods.

A low-pressure area developed into a depression on November 4 in the western Bay of Bengal near the southeastern Indian coast. By the next day, the depression weakened into a low-pressure area. The system dropped heavy rainfall along its path.

Season effects 

|-
| BOB 01 ||  || bgcolor=#| || bgcolor=#| || bgcolor=#| || None || None || None ||
|-
| BOB 02 ||  || bgcolor=#| || bgcolor=#| || bgcolor=#| || Bangladesh, Myanmar ||  || 350 ||
|-
| ARB 01 ||  || bgcolor=#| || bgcolor=#| || bgcolor=#| || Western India, Oman || || ||
|-
| Deep depression ||  || bgcolor=#| || bgcolor=#| || bgcolor=#| || India, Pakistan || None || None ||
|-
| Deep depression ||  || bgcolor=#| || bgcolor=#| || bgcolor=#| || India || || 38 ||
|-
| BOB 03 ||  || bgcolor=#| || bgcolor=#| || bgcolor=#| || India ||  || 304 ||
|-
| Depression ||  || bgcolor=#| || bgcolor=#| || bgcolor=#| || Southern India || None || None ||
|-
| ARB 02 ||  || bgcolor=#| || bgcolor=#| || bgcolor=#| || Somalia || || 30 ||
|-

See also 

 North Indian Ocean tropical cyclone season
 1994 Atlantic hurricane season
 1994 Pacific hurricane season
 1994 Pacific typhoon season
 South-West Indian Ocean cyclone season: 1993–94, 1994–95
 Australian region cyclone season: 1993–94, 1994–95
 South Pacific cyclone season: 1993–94, 1994–95

Notes

References

External links 
 India Meteorological Department
 Joint Typhoon Warning Center